A garden centre (Commonwealth English spelling; U.S. nursery or garden center) is a retail operation that sells plants and related products for the domestic garden as its primary business.

It is a development from the concept of the retail plant nursery but with a wider range of outdoor products and on-site facilities. It is now usual for garden centres to obtain their stock from plants which have been propagated elsewhere, such as by specialist nurseries or wholesalers.

United Kingdom 
A garden centre in the UK sells plants, compost, fertilizers, tools and landscaping products such as statues, furniture and garden ornaments. Some also sell pet-related products and small pets such as guinea pigs, rabbits, fish and mice. Additionally, many centres now have cafes or restaurants within their stores. Most garden centres have branched out and sell home and interior products as well, such as items of furniture. Garden centres have also branched out into selling goods based around camping and the outdoors, selling clothing and items related to outdoor activities.
In 2010 the value of the garden retail market in the UK stood at £4.6 billion per annum.  The sector comprises a mix of independent small businesses, of which there are approximately 2,500 centres, plus a number of national or regional chains.

The major garden centre chains in the UK include:

The DIY chains B&Q and Homebase also have their own garden departments, incorporated within or alongside their traditional DIY warehouses or stores.

In recent years, garden centres have evolved to become a leisure destination with play centres for children, restaurants and other activities designed to improve the shopping experience and increase the time spent at the centre. These changes have partly come about because the main competitors to the traditional garden centres, such as the DIY chains, have brought down prices. Competition has also increased from online garden centres such as Crocus and Gardening Express, although companies such as Blue Diamond, Capital Gardens, Dobbies, Riverside Garden Centre and Longacres have now responded by developing and marketing their own online operations.  Some open-air attractions (e.g. RHS Garden, Wisley, Westonbirt Arboretum) also run small garden centres as additional sources of revenue or to discourage the unofficial taking of plant cuttings.

The peak business seasons in the UK are spring (March to June) and autumn (September and October). In addition, garden centres also experience surges in popularity through the start of the winter season (November to January), when most of them sell goods related to Christmas, such as decorations and festive plants. Additionally, it is now not abnormal for garden centres to experience their peak season within the winter months, due to the surge in popularity of garden centres around Christmas time.

A garden centre offers more products and services than the traditional nursery which mainly retails plants. Garden centres offer not only garden supplies but also leisure buildings, garden furniture, products for pets and fish keeping, and giftware and home products, up-market farm shop style food offerings are also becoming the norm in many garden centres. Many larger centres also have florist departments, wild bird care and their own restaurants. They have also diversified into the Christmas market heavily supplying such goods as traditional Christmas Trees, decorations and novelty and seasonal foods.

Garden centres include concessions that are either operated as manned, unmanned or short-term promotional businesses. They trade under a lease and licence contract which govern the business relationship. Garden centre concessions use their own branding, employ their own personnel and transact their sales through their own tills. The concessions are granted a degree of exclusivity to retail their product ranges which are complementary to the garden centre.

The oldest garden centre in the UK was, until 2014, Anlex in West Wycombe, Buckinghamshire. This had traded in latter years under the 'Plant and Harvest' and 'Flowerland' brandings A walled garden, built as the kitchen gardens for the Dashwood Estate, it had been selling plants since 1775, sold plants and sundries and had a cafe and farm shop.

In 2007, the retailer Tesco made a move into the garden centre market through acquisition, resulting in 2008 in the purchase of the Dobbies chain. They later sold the chain in 2016, to focus on their core supermarket business.

United States 

The United States retail garden-center market contained roughly 16,000 independently operated companies in 2010 according to Research and Markets. The combined annual revenue for the lot of them is about $30 billion. Most garden centers are independently owned.  There are some regional chains, but there is no national US garden center chain, unlike in the UK where there are several. However, both of the largest home improvement stores in the US—Lowe's and The Home Depot—refer to their gardening departments as garden centers and larger hardware stores have "Lawn and Garden" departments.

Some of the items that can be found in US garden centers, often called nurseries, include annual and perennial flowers, trees and shrubs, roses, container gardens, hanging baskets, houseplants, water gardening, seeds and bulbs, potting mixes, soil amendments and mulch, fertilizers and chemicals, pottery, garden tools and supplies, fountains and garden decor, much like their UK counterparts.

Many US garden centers have other departments including wild bird feeding, floral, gift, outdoor furniture and barbecue grills, home decor, landscape design, landscaping services and pet supplies. Most garden centers have a large Christmas department during the holiday season. Some garden centres have added a cafe or coffee bar, but not like the restaurants found in some European garden centres.

Greenhouses are commonly part of a US garden center.  Greenhouses protect the plants from late cold snaps, allow stores to keep houseplants in prime condition, and keep the customers dry on rainy days.

Garden centers employ horticulturists who can diagnose problems and make recommendations to gardeners.  This is almost always provided as a free service in the store and some of the bigger garden centers have classes that are open to the public.

Many garden centers belong to a buying cooperative.  The largest is Master Nursery Garden Centers with just under 800 members followed by Home and Garden Showplace (part of the larger cooperative the True Value Company) with 260 members, Northwest Nursery Buyers Association with 46 members and finally, ECGC with 14 very large garden center members.

The trade associations of independent garden centers in the US is the Garden Centers of America and the American Nursery & Landscape Association.

Germany
In Germany, garden centers which are part of big chains' hardware stores collect the majority of sales, followed by a few specialized chains that are somewhat smaller.

See also 
 Garden
 Gardener
 Gardening
 Leroy Merlin

References

External links
 American Nursery & Landscape Association
 The Horticultural Trades Association

 
Retailers by type of merchandise sold